Disteghil Sar or Distaghil Sar is the highest mountain in the Shimshal Valley, part of the Karakoram mountain range in Gilgit-Baltistan, Pakistan. It is the 19th-highest mountain on Earth and the 7th-highest in Pakistan. Disteghil sar is a Wakhi language word suggested by the Wakhi people of Shimshal, meaning "above the inner ranch." The mountain has a  top ridge above 7,400 meters elevation, with three distinct summits: Northwest, 7885 m; Central, 7760 m; and Southeast, 7696m or 7535m.

Climbing history
Distaghil Sar was first climbed in 1960 by Günther Stärker and Diether Marchart of an Austrian expedition led by Wolfgang Stefan. The expedition climbed the western part of the south face and continued over the southwest ridge to the highest summit. Three years earlier, in 1957, an English expedition had attempted to climb the mountain from the south and the west, but failed due to bad weather. Likewise, weather foiled a 1959 Swiss attempt over the southeast ridge.
The highest, western summit has been scaled twice since in 1980 and 1982 over the original route. Two attempts over the daunting north face, in 1988 and 1998, were unsuccessful. The eastern summit was first climbed in 1980 by a Polish expedition over the east face, and was reascended in 1983.

See also
 List of mountains in Pakistan
 Highest Mountains of the World

References

Sources
Hohe Siebentausender (in German)
The Himalayan Index

Seven-thousanders of the Karakoram
Mountains of Gilgit-Baltistan